is a Japanese astronomer affiliated with the Susono Observatory (886). He is a discoverer of minor planets, credited by the Minor Planet Center with the discovery of 16 numbered minor planets during 1989–1999.

In 1992 he discovered the asteroid 6251 Setsuko in collaboration with astronomer Toshimasa Furuta, and named it after his wife Setsuko Akiyama (b. 1953) in May 1996.

The main-belt asteroid 4904 Makio, discovered by Yoshikane Mizuno and Toshimasa Furuta at Kani Observatory (403) in 1989, is named after him. Naming citation was published on 5 March 1996.

References 
 

1950 births
Discoverers of asteroids

20th-century Japanese astronomers
Living people